Dictyna tullgreni is a species of spider in the family Dictynidae. The scientific name of this species was first published in 1949 by Lodovico di Caporiacco.

References

Endemic fauna of Kenya
Dictynidae
Invertebrates of Kenya
Spiders of Africa
Spiders described in 1949